Muse is a census-designated place located in Cecil Township, Washington County, Pennsylvania. The community is located in northern Washington County north of the borough of Canonsburg. As of the 2010 census the population was 2,504 residents.

Demographics

Notable people
 Paul Pozonsky, former judge of the Courts of Common Pleas in Washington County, Pennsylvania
 Ann Cindrić (1922-2010), pitcher in All-American Girls Professional Baseball League
Doug Kotar, NFL player
John Macerelli, NFL player
Andy Seminick, MLB player

References

Census-designated places in Washington County, Pennsylvania
Census-designated places in Pennsylvania